The Best of Cameo is a greatest hits album by the funk group Cameo, released in 1993.  In total, nine albums are represented by 14 tracks. The Best of Cameo, Volume 2 was released three years later.

Track listing
 "Word Up!" – 4:19 - Blackmon/Jenkins
 "Single Life – 6:35 - Blackmon/Jenkins
 "Candy" – 5:39 - Blackmon/Jenkins
 "Shake Your Pants" – 6:21 - Blackmon
 "Rigor Mortis" – 5:21 - Blackmon/Leftenant/Leftenant
 "Attack Me With Your Love" – 4:30 - Blackmon/Kendrick
 "Talkin' Out the Side of Your Neck" – 4:05 - Blackmon/Jenkins/Leftenant/Singleton
 "Sparkle" – 4:51 - Blackmon/Lockett
 "Back and Forth" – 3:52 - Blackmon/Jenkins/Kendrick/Leftenant
 "Flirt" – 4:06 -  Blackmon/Jenkins
 "She's Strange" – 6:52 (12" rap version) - Blackmon/Jenkins/Leftenant/Singleton
 "I Just Want to Be" – 5:18 - Blackmon/Johnson
 "Skin I'm In" – 6:25 - Blackmon
 "It's Over" – 4:16 - Blackmon/Jenkins/Leftenant

Charts
 Top R&B/Hip-Hop Albums - #44

See also
The Best of Cameo, Volume 2
Best of Cameo
The Best of Cameo

References

Cameo (band) compilation albums
1993 greatest hits albums
Mercury Records compilation albums